Western Pennsylvania is a region in the Commonwealth of Pennsylvania encompassing the western third of the state. Pittsburgh is the region's principal city, with a metropolitan area population of about 2.4 million people, and serves as its economic and cultural center. Erie, Altoona, and Johnstown are its other metropolitan centers. As of the 2010 census, Western Pennsylvania's total population is nearly 4 million.

Although the Commonwealth does not designate Western Pennsylvania as an official region, since colonial times it has retained a distinct identity not only because of its geographical distance from Philadelphia, the beginning of Pennsylvania settlement, but especially because of its topographical separation from the east by virtue of the Appalachian Mountains, which characterize much of the western region. The strong cultural identity of Western Pennsylvania is reinforced by the state supreme court holding sessions in Pittsburgh, in addition to Harrisburg and Philadelphia.

Counties 

Since at least the early twentieth century, scholarly books such as Guidebook to Historic Western Pennsylvania, published by the University of Pittsburgh Press (1938), formally define the region as the twenty-six counties west of the Appalachian divide, a meridian from the north at McKean County down and along its eastern border and ending in the south at Bedford County.

In alphabetical order those counties are:

 Allegheny
 Armstrong
 Beaver
 Bedford
 Blair
 Butler
 Cambria
 Cameron
 Clarion
 Clearfield
 Crawford
 Elk
 Erie
 Fayette
 Forest
 Greene
 Indiana
 Jefferson
 Lawrence
 McKean
 Mercer
 Somerset
 Venango
 Warren
 Washington
 Westmoreland

Description 
Long recognized as a powerhouse of American industry, Western Pennsylvania is a large geophysical and socio-economic entity. It encompasses that portion of the state to the west of the Appalachian divide and included within the Mississippi drainage system of rivers.

The largest rivers in this area are the Allegheny River, which flows southward from the New York border, and the Monongahela River, which flows northward from West Virginia. The juncture of the Allegheny and Monongahela was historically regarded as strategic and the gateway to the interior of the continent from the east. At various times this juncture has been called the Forks of the Ohio, Fort Duquesne, Fort Pitt, the Golden Triangle, and today, at its apex, Point State Park. Incredibly, after several decades of border war and 150 years of high-rent city-center urbanization, the original 1764 blockhouse from Fort Pitt still stands here and is one of the oldest buildings in the region.

Other notable rivers are the Youghiogheny River, flowing north from West Virginia and western Maryland to join the Monongahela just upriver of Pittsburgh, and which was the early route of penetration into Western Pennsylvania, the Kiskiminetas River, French Creek, a major passageway between Lake Erie and the Allegheny River for the Indians and early French explorers and traders, and the small Oil Creek in Crawford and Venango counties, where slicks gave an indication of petroleum reserves and in whose watershed the first oil well in the United States was drilled.

To the west and north of this point lies the Allegheny Plateau, a dissected plateau so eroded that it appears to be an interminable series of high hills and steep valleys. The peaks in the area are among the lowest in the East Coast highlands, but what they lack in height they make up in wide extent of land covered, which forms a vast formidable barrier for mile upon mile to overland travel from the coast.

Northwestern Pennsylvania 
The city of Erie is the business center and cultural hub of Northwestern Pennsylvania. The compiled population of the region was estimated to be 938,516 in 2015. Although the only county with population growth was Butler, the deficit for all other counties was within 3%.  The region also includes the Erie-Meadville, PA Combined Statistical Area.

Northwestern Pennsylvania is home to the Allegheny National Forest, and is the heart of Pennsylvania's oil and gas economy.

Education 
Western Pennsylvania is home to more than two dozen institutions of higher learning, including those listed below.
(Seminaries are not listed)

Allegheny College
The Art Institute of Pittsburgh
Community College of Allegheny County (several campuses)
Community College of Beaver County
Butler County Community College (several campuses)
California University of Pennsylvania
Carlow University
Carnegie Mellon University
Chatham University
Clarion University of Pennsylvania
Duquesne University
Edinboro University of Pennsylvania
Gannon University
Geneva College
Grove City College
Indiana University of Pennsylvania (several branch campuses)
LaRoche College
Lake Erie College of Osteopathic Medicine
Mercyhurst University
Mount Aloysius College
Penn Highlands Community College
Pennsylvania State University (several branch campuses)
Point Park University
Robert Morris University
Saint Francis University
Saint Vincent College
Seton Hill University
Slippery Rock University of Pennsylvania
Thiel College
University of Pittsburgh (several campuses)
Vincentian Academy
Washington and Jefferson College
Waynesburg University
Westminster College
Westmoreland County Community College

Distinctiveness 

Western Pennsylvania is distinctive from the rest of the state due to several important and complex factors:
 The initial difficulty of transportation access from the east involved many miles of seemingly endless parallel ridges of the Appalachian Mountains, and then the broken hills and valleys of the Allegheny Plateau, all of which were covered in thick forests. The initial method of access from areas east of the Appalachians, was to travel southbound outside of Pennsylvania, then follow the Potomac River northwest through Maryland and Virginia, and then re-enter the state in its southwest corner. Various methods of more direct transport were later tried, including a canal system westbound over the mountains and then, later, the Pennsylvania Railroad which extended the railroad systems of the East Coast west to Pittsburgh and the Ohio Valley. Perhaps the best known transportation innovation to simplify access to this area is the famous Pennsylvania Turnpike, the first modern limited access highway in North America.
 The initial problem was economic marketing of a limited number of goods that could stand such high freight costs. The insensitivity of the new U.S. Federal Government to the marketing problems in the west led to the Whiskey Rebellion in Western Pennsylvania, an event which seriously challenged the political viability of the new American nation. Later marketing arrangements turned to access via the Ohio River, with Pittsburgh a barge and steamboat center of the mid-continent. Today, Pittsburgh is still strongly oriented to the rivers; the port of Pittsburgh ranks No. 13 by tonnage in the US and even surpasses the Port of Philadelphia in tonnage, due to the heavy shipping of bulk coal by barge inland on the rivers. Locally, a system of agriculture arose suitable to Western Pennsylvania's rugged terrain, emphasizing animal husbandry and dairying but with few exportable vegetable crops. The search for some sort of exportable agricultural specialty perhaps also encouraged the rise of the sauce industry and its first location at Sharpsburg in what was later to become the large H.J. Heinz Company.
 The search for exploitable resources first resulted with the development of huge bituminous coal or "soft" coal deposits in the area for use in a growing iron foundry sector.  However, it was not until the realization by Andrew Carnegie, that Western Pennsylvania possessed an optimum location for a very large scale American steel sector, that this area, especially Pittsburgh, became known for the industrial specialty that characterizes it today. The region also had large glass, pottery, brickmaking, and ceramic industries, which took advantage of the coal and the sand and clay in local soils. The local glass industry produced 45 percent of the nation's output in glass by the 1860s and more than 80 percent of the output by the 1920s. The rise and subsequent decline of the American steel industry at Pittsburgh introduces a host of complex economic concepts necessary to understand why that particular activity centered in this particular place, including the notions of classical Weberian location analysis for more than one input, the Pittsburgh Plus system for maintaining advantageous freight costs to ship to the market, vertical integration and supply innovations such as the development of the Mesabi Range, the ore freighter as a transport vehicle, and the construction of the Soo Locks. Other necessary economic concepts for description could well include economies of scale, diseconomies of scale, monopoly (or cartel) price equilibrium, and "dumping". Labor relations problems historically were frequent in the earlier steel sector, and mention should be made of the United Steel Workers of America, as well as the contemporary issue of "legacy costs" arising from heavy entitlements to a large retired labor force after sharply downsizing to today's level of employment.
 Other exploitable resources in Western Pennsylvania were also distinct. One was the drilling of the first oil well in the world at Titusville and the rise of the US petroleum industry. Another was widespread deforestation of the outlying areas and their subsequent reforestation under Gifford Pinchot, who instituted the first large scale government sponsored timber management effort in the USA. During this time of intensive exploitation of forests a whole new sector, the wood chemistry industry, appeared and then later vanished. Finally, mention should also be made of management in the forested areas of a large animal population which supports the famous "Pennsylvania deer-hunting" cultural ethos. The first day of deer-hunting season is a de facto unofficial holiday in much of the central and northern regions of the state, when absence from work or school is generally tolerated with no explanation necessary.
 Since the early 1950s, a renaissance occurred in the development of cultural institutions and abatement of pollution in Pittsburgh and its surrounding area. The effects of this increase in livability are particularly apparent in the Golden Triangle district of Downtown Pittsburgh, which at one point had been plagued with so much industrial haze that drivers used their headlights in mid-day.  However, this social improvement has not always been accompanied by a serious plan of regional economic development to assess what, precisely, should fill the income void after the departure of steel. In addition, the city of Pittsburgh continues to become de-populated and has recently been put under state supervision of its finances.
 Culturally, the distinctiveness of Western Pennsylvania is underlined by the existence of a unique local dialect called "Pittsburghese" or Pittsburgh English, sometimes affectionately termed the "yinzer" dialect, due to its use of the term "yins" (also spelled "yunz, "yinz", "youns", etc.) as the plural form of "you". This is probably a legacy of Ulster-Scots settlement in the area. Western Pennsylvanians also refer to soft drinks as "pop" while in the eastern half of the state it is referred to as "soda."
 The Erie Triangle and the city of Erie give Pennsylvania a port along the Great Lakes. This region in unique within western Pennsylvania in that it maintains stronger geographic and cultural connections with western New York than it does with western Pennsylvania, due in large part to its identification with the eastern Great Lakes region, rather than Appalachia. This is reflected in the city and county of Erie sharing far more similarities with Buffalo and southwestern New York than it does with Pittsburgh and western Pennsylvania. The Erie region is also known for its distinct agriculture, centered on grapes and other fruit, due to the moderating climatic influence, in both summer and fall, of Lake Erie. (In winter, the area is often inundated with "lake-effect" snow.) There are also small commercial fresh-water fisheries and many streams and smaller lakes with a variety of fish to catch, including yellow perch and walleye.
 In Stonycreek Township is the memorial and crash site of United Airlines Flight 93, the "Let's Roll" flight which occurred on 9/11 in 2001 after passengers attempted to overpower the plane's hijackers. The site is an informal patriotic shrine with many hand-made mementos voluntarily gracing the area. There is a movement to add the site to the National Park System. It is a startling coincidence that the Stoneycreek site is comparatively close to the other centuries-earlier locations of military engagements in Western Pennsylvania, such as Fort Duquesne and the area of the Whiskey Rebellion. This can in part be explained by the fact that all these locations were on a strategic route from eastern settlements in Pennsylvania and Virginia (and, later, Washington, D.C.) to the West.

Sports
Pittsburgh boasts three major league sports teams: the Pittsburgh Steelers of the National Football League, the Pittsburgh Pirates of Major League Baseball, and the Pittsburgh Penguins of the National Hockey League. Meanwhile, the Pittsburgh Panthers is an NCAA Division I college team. Erie and Johnstown both have junior ice hockey teams as well. The Erie Otters play in the Ontario Hockey League and the Johnstown Tomahawks play in the North American Hockey League.

See also

List of Appalachian Regional Commission counties#Pennsylvania
Northwestern Pennsylvania
Pittsburgh metropolitan area
Western Pennsylvania Conservancy

References

Sources 
 

Regions of Pennsylvania
Allegheny Plateau
History of Pittsburgh
Pennsylvania culture